Jabłoniec may refer to the following places in Poland:
Jabłoniec, Lower Silesian Voivodeship (south-west Poland)
Jabłoniec, Lubusz Voivodeship (west Poland)
Jabłoniec, Bytów County in Pomeranian Voivodeship (north Poland)
Jabłoniec, Słupsk County in Pomeranian Voivodeship (north Poland)